Master of Riglos (died circa 1460), was a Spanish Gothic painter.

Biography
He was active in Aragon during the years 1435–1460. He is known for religious works.

References

Master of Riglos on Artnet

1460 deaths
Spanish painters
People from Zaragoza
Year of birth missing